Ross Elliott (born Elliott Blum; June 18, 1917 – August 12, 1999) was an American television and film character actor. He began his acting career in the Mercury Theatre, where he performed in The War of the Worlds, Orson Welles' famed radio program.

Early years
Elliott was born in the Bronx, New York. While at City College of New York, he participated in the college's dramatic society, causing him to abandon his original plan to become a lawyer.

Stage
Directly out of college, Elliott joined Orson Welles' Mercury Theatre, garnering bit parts both on the radio (including the notorious War of the Worlds production) and stage (including Welles' Caesar). Elliott's Broadway credits include The Shoemaker's Holiday (1938), Danton's Tod (1938), Morning Star (1940), This Is the Army (1942), and Apple of His Eye (1946). In 1972, he returned to the stage in Shakespeare's King Lear with the Santa Monica Theater Guild.

Military service
Elliott joined the United States Army on August 4, 1941. Much of his time there was spent in "soldier-casts of various touring shows."

Film career
After serving in World War II, Elliott moved to Hollywood. He enjoyed a long career, working steadily in supporting roles in a diverse array of films, including Woman on the Run, D-Day the Sixth of June, The Beast from 20,000 Fathoms, Tarantula!, Wild Seed, Kelly's Heroes, Skyjacked and The Towering Inferno. In 1971, Elliott was invited to membership in the Actors Branch of the Academy of Motion Picture Arts and Sciences, remaining a member until his death in 1999.

Television
Throughout his career, Elliott appeared in more than 200 television programs, including the recurring role of crewman Cort Ryker on the syndicated The Blue Angels (1960–1961). Elliott appeared 59 times in a recurring role as Sheriff Abbott on NBC's western series, The Virginian.

Elliott portrayed the television director in the season one episode of I Love Lucy titled "Lucy Does a TV Commercial" (1952) in which Lucy Ricardo advertises Vitameatavegamin. Elliott also appeared on I Love Lucy as Ricky Ricardo's agent in three episodes of the series' fourth season.

In 1956 he appeared as Sam Wilson on the TV western Cheyenne in the episode titled "Mustang Trail". In 1958, Elliott played Reverend Kilgore in the episode "The Lord Will Provide" on The Texan, with Rory Calhoun and Ellen Corby. Later that year he played murder victim and title character George Hartley Beaumont in the Perry Mason episode "The Case of the Corresponding Corpse".

In 1960 and 1961 Elliott appeared twice on the popular Leave it to Beaver, including as the boys' school principal. From 1962 to 1963, he was cast as Marty Rhodes in four episodes of the NBC legal drama Sam Benedict, starring Edmond O'Brien. From 1963 to 1965, Elliott played Lee Baldwin on the ABC Daytime soap opera General Hospital.

Elliott appeared in 11 episodes of The Jack Benny Program as director Freddie. His other television appearances included Burns and Allen, The Twilight Zone, The Dick Van Dyke Show, The Andy Griffith Show, Adventures of Superman, The Lone Ranger, Pony Express, The Rifleman, Rawhide, Gunsmoke, Lassie, Leave It to Beaver, Combat!, Hazel, The Time Tunnel, Voyage to the Bottom of the Sea,  Dragnet, Adam-12, Emergency!, The Six Million Dollar Man, The Bionic Woman, Wonder Woman, The Dukes of Hazzard, and Little House on the Prairie. Elliott also appeared in a 1973 episode of Barnaby Jones.

Later Life
As his acting career waned, Elliott in 1976 joined a local real estate firm as a sales associate and later as a manager. He died of cancer on August 12, 1999 at the age of 82.

Selected filmography
 
 This Is the Army (1943) as Officer in Magician Skit
 The Burning Cross (1947) as The Combative Striker
 Angel on the Amazon (1948) as Frank Lane
 Streets of San Francisco (1949) as Clevens
 The Crooked Way (1949) as Coroner (uncredited)
 Barbary Pirate (1949) as Preble's First Officer (uncredited)
 The Gal Who Took the West (1949) as Cowboy (uncredited)
 Chinatown at Midnight (1949) as Eddie Marsh
 Gun Crazy (1950) as Detective (uncredited)
 Tyrant of the Sea (1950) as Mr. Howard Palmer
 Dynamite Pass (1950) as Henchman Stryker
 Cody of the Pony Express (1950) as Irv - Henchman
 Three Secrets (1950) as Reporter (uncredited)
 Woman on the Run (1950) as Frank Johnson
 Last of the Buccaneers (1950) as Fanuche - Pirate (uncredited)
 Chicago Calling (1951) as Jim
 Storm Warning (1951) as Glen (uncredited)
 I Can Get It for You Wholesale (1951) as Ray
 Hot Lead (1951) as Dave Collins
 Desert of Lost Men (1951) as Dr. Jim Haynes
 Loan Shark (1952) as Norm - Laundryman Thug (uncredited)
 Affair in Trinidad (1952) as Corpse of Neal Emery (uncredited)
 Woman in the Dark (1952) as Father Tony Morello
 Problem Girls (1953) as John Page
 The Beast from 20,000 Fathoms (1953) as George Ritchie
 Tumbleweed (1953) as Seth Blanden
 Ma and Pa Kettle at Home (1954) as Pete Crosby
 Massacre Canyon (1954) as Private George W. Davis
 Dragnet (1954) as Intelligence Div. Sergeant at Desk (uncredited)
 African Manhunt (1955) as Rene Carvel
 Carolina Cannonball (1955) as Don Mack
 Women's Prison (1955) as Don Jensen
 Tarantula (1955) as Joe Burch
 Toughest Man Alive (1955) as Security Agent Cal York
 Indestructible Man (1956) as Paul Lowe
 D-Day the Sixth of June (1956) as Maj. Mills
 Chain of Evidence (1957) as Bob Bradfield
 As Young as We Are (1958) as Bob
 Monster on the Campus (1958) as Sgt. Eddie Daniels
 Never So Few (1959) as Colonel Dr. Barry (uncredited)
 Sea Hunt (1960, The Catalyst, Season 3, Episode 32)
 Sea Hunt (1961, Season 4, Episodes 1, 3, 4, 7, 35)
 Tammy Tell Me True (1961) as Professor Bateman
 Bonanza (1961-1973, 3 episodes) as Watkins / Matthew / Harvey Walters
 The Thrill of It All (1963) as Minor Role (uncredited)
 The Crawling Hand (1963) as Deputy Earl Harrison
 The Wheeler Dealers (1963) as Lawyer (uncredited)
 The Lively Set (1964) as Ernie Owens
 Wild Seed (1965) as Mr. Collinge
 Day of the Evil Gun (1968) as Reverend Yearby
 The Invaders (1968, Counter-Attack, Season 2, Episode 18) as Prof. Eliot Kramer
 Kelly's Heroes (1970) as Colonel Booker
 Skyjacked (1972) as Harold Shaw
 The Longest Night (1972) as Dr. Steven Clay
 Act of Vengeance (1974) as Sgt. Long
 The Towering Inferno (1974) as Deputy Chief #2
 Gable and Lombard (1976) as Lombard's Director
 Mr. Too Little (1978) as Police Captain
 Scorpion (1986) as Sam Douglas (final film role)

References

External links

 
 
 

1917 births
1999 deaths
American male radio actors
American male television actors
People from the Bronx
Male actors from New York City
Male actors from Los Angeles
20th-century American male actors
Western (genre) television actors
Deaths from cancer in California